Michael O'Halloran (born 1937) is a former Irish Labour Party politician and trade unionist. He was a member of Dublin City Council from 1979 to 1991. He was elected at the 1979 local elections for the Artane electoral area, and was re-elected at the 1985 local elections. He served as Lord Mayor of Dublin from 1984 to 1985. He did not contest the 1991 local elections. While Lord Mayor, he led a campaign to Save the Pint.

He stood unsuccessfully as a Labour Party candidate at the 1977 general election for Dublin Artane. He was also unsuccessful at the 1981, February 1982 and 1989 general elections for the Dublin North-Central constituency.

References

 

1937 births
Living people
Lord Mayors of Dublin
People from Artane, Dublin
Labour Party (Ireland) politicians